Vladimir Vladimirovich Kuzmichyov (28 July 1979 – 24 September 2016) was a Russian footballer.

He was a pupil of FC Spartak Moscow. In his rookie season  he played for Chernomorets Novorossiysk.

On 24 September 2016 he died in a traffic accident.

References

External links

 
 Profile at fc-terek.ru 

1979 births
2016 deaths
Russian footballers
Russia under-21 international footballers
Association football forwards
FC Chernomorets Novorossiysk players
FC Dynamo Kyiv players
FC Dynamo-2 Kyiv players
PFC CSKA Moscow players
FC Torpedo Moscow players
FC Anzhi Makhachkala players
FC Kuban Krasnodar players
FC Akhmat Grozny players
PFC Spartak Nalchik players
FC Saturn Ramenskoye players
FC Khimki players
FC Sokol Saratov players
Russian expatriate footballers
Expatriate footballers in Ukraine
Russian expatriate sportspeople in Ukraine
Russian Premier League players
Ukrainian Premier League players
FC Vityaz Podolsk players
Road incident deaths in Russia
FC Spartak Moscow players
FC Dynamo Bryansk players